La belle au bois dormant is an opera in three acts by Michele Carafa to a French libretto by Eugène de Planard after the tale by Charles Perrault.

It was first performed on 2 March 1825 at the Salle Le Peletier of Paris Opera. The famous tenor Adolphe Nourrit created the role of the Prince. Choreography was by Pierre Gardel, and set design by Pierre-Luc-Charles Cicéri.

Main roles
Aurora, soprano
The Queen, soprano
The Prince, tenor
Carabosse, baritone
King Florestan, baritone

References

External links

Operas by Michele Carafa
French-language operas
Opéras féeries
1825 operas
Operas
Works based on Sleeping Beauty
Operas based on fairy tales
Operas based on works by Charles Perrault